Hypotrachyna alectorialiorum is a species of foliose lichen in the family Parmeliaceae. The specific epithet refers to the presence of the secondary chemicals alectorialic acid and hypoalectorialic acid.

References

alectorialiorum
Lichen species
Lichens described in 2009
Lichens of Southeast Brazil
Taxa named by John Alan Elix
Taxa named by Thomas Hawkes Nash III
Taxa named by Harrie Sipman